Deike Rickmers may refer to several ships:

 , built 1872, sold 1873 and renamed C R Bischop
 , built 1874, ran aground off Harwich in 1884
, sold in 1899 and renamed Holsatia
, seized in 1917 by China, renamed Hwah Ting
, ex Cartagena, purchased 1926, sold to Japan in 1927 and renamed Tami Maru
, ex Aker, purchased in 1929, sold in 1938 and renamed Helga Moller
, seized in 1945 and renamed Empire Concord and Azov
, in service

Ship names